Smalyavichy District is a second-level administrative subdivision (raion) of Belarus in Minsk Region. Its seat is the town of Smalyavichy but the most populated one is Zhodzina.

History
The district was created on 17 July 1924.

Geography

Overview
Situated in the north-east of its Region, Smalyavichy District borders with the districts of Minsk, Lahoysk, Barysaw and Chervyen. In its territory is located the International Airport of Minsk. It is crossed by the M1 motorway, part of the European route E30.

Main settlements
Zhodzina – 61,800
Smalyavichy: – 14,200
Zyaleny Bor: – ~4,000

Notes and references

External links

 Smalyavichy Raion official website
 District map on emaps-online

 
Districts of Minsk Region